The Battle of Wolfenbüttel (29 June 1641) took place near the town of Wolfenbüttel, in what is now Lower Saxony, during the Thirty Years' War. Swedish forces led by Carl Gustaf Wrangel and Hans Christoff von Königsmarck and Bernardines led by Jean-Baptiste Budes, Comte de Guébriant withstood an assault by Imperial forces led by Archduke Leopold Wilhelm of Austria, forcing the Imperials to retreat.

Background
Wolfenbüttel, occupied by Imperial forces, was a strategically insignificant town, but it held great value to the Swedes' Guelph allies. A Guelph army under Hans Caspar von Klitzing had blockaded the Imperial garrison under Johann Ernst, Baron von Ruischenberg since the previous autumn, but its 7,000 troops had been too small a force to reduce the town. Facing growing uncertainty in the wake of the death of General Johan Banér and mutinous troops following a year of inaction and failure, the Swedes needed to do something to ensure Guelph loyalty and prove to other German Protestant allies that they were still a reliable partner. Thus, they decided to assist in the Guelph siege of Wolfenbüttel. Hearing word of the Swedish advance, an Imperial army under Archduke Leopold Wilhelm of Austria and Ottavio Piccolomini raced to meet them. The race was essentially a draw. The Swedes under Carl Gustaf Wrangel and their Bernardine allies led by French general Jean-Baptiste Budes, Comte de Guébriant joined Klitzing's troops on 28 June, and the Imperial army arrived just two hours later.

Battle
The besiegers had created a fortified camp that was too hard to take by frontal assault, so Leopold Wilhelm ordered flanking attacks on both sides. Piccolomini's cavalry attacked the Swedish left, but was driven back with light casualties. Meanwhile, the Bavarians under Joachim Christian von Wahl attacked the Swedish right through a woods containing a small redoubt manned by Banér's legendary "Old Blue" Swedish regiment. The Bavarians took heavy casualties storming the woods but finally succeeded in taking the redoubt from the "Old Blue," only to be driven back by a cavalry counterattack dispatched by Guébriant from the main camp. At this point, Leopold Wilhelm decided to withdraw, having taken around 3,000 casualties in total, although the Swedes had also paid a heavy price for their victory, having lost 2,000 men, with the heaviest toll coming out of the most experienced and veteran troops of the "Old Blue" regiment.

References

Sources
 

Wolfenbüttel
Wolfenbüttel
Wolfenbuttel (1641)
Wolfenbuttel (1641)
Wolfenbuttel
Wolfenbüttel
Wolfenbüttel
1641 in Europe